America's Got Talent: Extreme (also known as AGT: Extreme) is an American reality television and talent competition series created by Simon Cowell that aired on NBC from February 21 to March 14, 2022, following a sneak peek episode that aired on February 20. The series is a spinoff of America's Got Talent that focuses on stunt performers. Terry Crews hosts the series, with Cowell, Nikki Bella, and Travis Pastrana serving as judges.

Format 

The series is conducted using a condensed version of the format used in the main America's Got Talent series, and focuses exclusively on larger-scale acts—primarily stunt performers—that are unsuited for a traditional stage setting.

Similarly to the main series, acts that receive a majority vote from the judging panel during their audition performance advance to the finals, the judges may use buzzers to signal their disapproval of an act (with the performance automatically ending if all three judges use their buzzer), while each judge, along with host Terry Crews, can use the "Golden Buzzer" to automatically advance one act of their choice to the finals, regardless of the opinion of the other judges.

In the finale, the acts are further eliminated (with acts now voted on by a panel of "superfans", similarly to America's Got Talent: The Champions), reaching a top four, and then a top two—with the winner receiving $500,000.

Production 
On May 14, 2021, NBC announced that it had ordered America's Got Talent: Extreme as the second U.S. spinoff of America's Got Talent, following America's Got Talent: The Champions, with franchise creator Simon Cowell confirmed as an executive producer and judge for the series. On October 1, 2021, it was announced that retired WWE wrestler Nikki Bella and extreme sportsman Travis Pastrana would serve as judges alongside Cowell. Main AGT host Terry Crews also hosts Extreme.

Filming occurred at the Atlanta Motor Speedway in Hampton, Georgia from September 27 to October 20, 2021. Escape artist Jonathan Goodwin was hospitalized following an accident during a rehearsal, in which he was crushed between two cars in mid-air and fell to the ground whilst trying to escape a straitjacket. A spokesperson confirmed to Variety on October 15 that production had been temporarily suspended.  Filming would later resume and wrap in early January 2022 at the Irwindale Speedway in Irwindale, California.

The series was originally scheduled to premiere in midseason summer 2021. On January 19, 2022, it was announced that the four-episode series would premiere on February 21, 2022, pushing back American Song Contest on NBC's winter schedule due to COVID-19-related concerns. A half-hour sneak peek aired on February 20, following the primetime broadcast of the 2022 Winter Olympics closing ceremony.

On May 16, 2022, NBC shelved the series indefinitely.

Episodes

Season overview 
The following below lists the results of each participant's overall performance in this season:

  |  | 
  |  Golden Buzzer Audition |  Wildcard Finalist

  Ages denoted for a participant(s), pertain to their final performance for this season.

Preliminaries summary

Preliminary 1 (February 21)

Preliminary 2 (February 28)

Preliminary 3 (March 7)

Preliminary 4 (March 14)

Finale (March 14)
Guest Performers: Avril Lavigne, Travis Barker & Travis Pastrana

 |  |

Ratings

References

External links 
 
 

2020s American variety television series
2022 American television series debuts
2022 American television series endings
America's Got Talent
American television spin-offs
Competitions in the United States
English-language television shows
NBC original programming
Reality television spin-offs
Talent shows
Television series by Fremantle (company)
Television shows filmed in California
Television shows filmed in Georgia (U.S. state)